A cuckquean is the wife of an adulterous husband (or partner for unmarried companions), and the gender-opposite of a cuckold. In evolutionary biology, the term is also applied to females who are investing parental effort in offspring that are not genetically their own. Similar prying within a family is called wittoldry. The term is derived from Early Modern English dating back to AD 1562.

Cuckqueanry as a fetish
A cuckquean fetishist is aware of her partner's activity, sometimes actively encouraging it, and derives sexual pleasure from it.  Among some fetishists, the cuckquean's humiliation or victimization is a major element of the paraphilia. 

In the fetish cuckqueaning subculture, the male takes on the role of being sexually dominant, while the female takes on a submissive role. The wife usually only becomes involved with the man or his lover when he permits it—sometimes remaining altogether celibate.

Cuckqueanry (and cuckolding) is commonly depicted as a heteronormative sexual fantasy and/or activity played out between a husband and wife, but can involve any number of gender and sexual orientations. When the fetish is simply androphilic or heterosexual, the wife has sex only with her husband; when it is bi-sexual, the wife has sex with both her husband and the other woman, or only with the other woman. 

The fetish specifics can range wildly. Sometimes the husband and his lovers can treat the cuckquean lovingly; sometimes it involves nothing but swinging, swapping husbands or sharing a lover.  But when it goes beyond this, the fetish can require that the cuckquean be humiliated or debased.  Sometimes this may be accidental or incidental (e.g., the parties involved are too aroused to stop), but at other times the humiliation may be intentional, and the husband and his lovers act out a story or perform a ritual in which they force the cuckquean to perform humiliating acts, or enter into circumstances that debase her.

Lehmiller (2020) differentiates between fantasies about watching one's partner have sex with someone else as voyeuristic cuckolding and fantasies about having sex with someone else while one's partner watches as exhibitionistic cuckolding, with women more likely to fantasize about exhibitionistic cuckolding than to fantasize about voyeuristic cuckolding.

See also

 Adultery
 Candaulism
 Crime of passion
 Concubinage
 Cuckold
 Erotic humiliation
 Human sperm competition
 Open marriage
 Polyamory
 Polyandry, marriage to plural husbands
 Polygyny, marriage to plural wives
 Pregnancy fetishism
 Swinging

References 

Marriage
Sexual fidelity
Sexual fetishism